FC Energetik-BGU Minsk is a Belarusian football club based in Minsk.

History
The team was founded in 1996 as Zvezda Minsk. BGU is a Russian abbreviation and stands for the Belarusian State University.

Zvezda-VA-BGU made its debut in Premier League in 2002 and played there until 2005. Since 2006, the team plays in lower leagues.

In 2006, Zvezda-BGU reached the semi-final of the Belarusian Cup.

Name changes
1996: founded as Zvezda Minsk
1998: renamed to Zvezda-VA-BGU Minsk 
2005: renamed to Zvezda-BGU Minsk
2017: renamed to Energetik-BGU Minsk

Current squad

Domestic history

Energetik in Europe

References

External links
Official website
RCOP-BGU website

Football clubs in Belarus
Football clubs in Minsk
1996 establishments in Belarus
Association football clubs established in 1996